Mihai Mandache (4 September 1960 – 25 July 2019) was a Romanian backstroke swimmer. He competed in two events at the 1980 Summer Olympics.

References

External links
 

1960 births
2019 deaths
Romanian male backstroke swimmers
Olympic swimmers of Romania
Swimmers at the 1980 Summer Olympics
Place of birth missing